Salatul Tasbih (صلاة تسبيح) also known as supplication prayer, is a form of sunnah prayer. As the name suggests, this unique prayer involves reciting the tasbih many times and it is said those who pray this particular way will have many of their sins forgiven. Prophet Muhammad advised the Muslims to pray this at least once in their lifetime.

Procedure 

   
This unique prayer consists of four rakats which is divided into two separate sets.

It is important to note that this prayer is not particularly different from any other prayer. The only difference is the inclusion of tasbih and can only be recited after you finished the glorifications as the person would in any other prayers.

 Make the intention and begin the prayer, afterwards utter the tasbih 15 times.
 Recite Surah Fatiha and the secondary surah, then utter the tasbih 10 times.
 After doing the ruku and its recitation, utter the tasbih 10 times.
 After standing up and its recitation, utter the tasbih 10 times.
 In the first sujud with its recitation, utter the tasbih 10 times.
 In the Jalsa (sitting between the twin sujud) utter the tasbih 10 times
 Finally, in the second sujud and its recitation, utter the tasbih 10 times
 Repeat until four rakats had been done.

In total one should be reciting 300 tasbih in its entirety.

Hadith 
Narrated Abdullah Ibn Abbas:

The Messenger of Allah (ﷺ) said to al-Abbas ibn AbdulMuttalib: Abbas, my uncle, shall I not give you, shall I not present to you, shall I not donate to you, shall I not produce for you ten things? If you act upon them, Allah will forgive you your sins, first and last, old and new, involuntary and voluntary, small and great, secret and open.

These are the ten things: you should pray four rak'ahs, reciting in each one Fatihat al-Kitab and a surah. When you finish the recitation of the first rak'ah you should say fifteen times while standing: "Glory be to Allah", "Praise be to Allah", "There is no god but Allah", "Allah is most great". Then you should bow and say it ten times while bowing. Then you should raise your head after bowing and say it ten times. Then you should kneel down in prostration and say it ten times while prostrating yourself. Then you should raise your head after prostration and say it ten times. Then you should prostrate yourself and say it ten times. Then you should raise your head after prostrating and say it ten times in every rak'ah. You should do that in four rak'ahs.

If you can observe it once daily, do so; if not, then once weekly; if not, then once a month; if not, then once a year; if not, then once in your lifetime.

See also 
 Tahajjud
 Mubah

References

External links
 How do you pray Salatul Tasbih?
 Learn How to Pray Salatul Tasbih

Salah
Islamic belief and doctrine